The 2014 Masters Tournament was the 78th edition of the Masters Tournament, the first of golf's four major championships in 2014. It was held April 10–13 at Augusta National Golf Club in Augusta, Georgia. Bubba Watson won his second Masters, three shots ahead of runners-up Jonas Blixt and Jordan Spieth; defending champion Adam Scott tied for fourteenth place.

After world number one Tiger Woods withdrew, three entered Augusta with a chance to leave with the top ranking. Adam Scott needed a two-way tie for third, Henrik Stenson a two-way tie for second, and Jason Day a win. The trio finished T-14, T-14, and T-20, respectively, so Woods remained number one.

Course

Field
The Masters has the smallest field of the four major championships. Officially, the Masters remains an invitation event, but there is a set of qualifying criteria that determines who is included in the field. Each player is classified according to the first category by which he qualified, with other categories in which he qualified shown in parentheses.

Golfers who qualify based solely on their performance in amateur tournaments (categories 6–10) must remain amateurs on the starting day of the tournament to be eligible to play.

1. Past Masters Champions
Ángel Cabrera (11), Fred Couples, Ben Crenshaw, Trevor Immelman, Zach Johnson (15,16,17,18), Bernhard Langer, Sandy Lyle, Phil Mickelson (3,12,13,15,16,17,18), Larry Mize, José María Olazábal, Mark O'Meara, Charl Schwartzel (16,17,18), Adam Scott (11,13,15,16,17,18), Vijay Singh, Craig Stadler, Bubba Watson (15,17,18), Tom Watson, Mike Weir, Ian Woosnam

(Past champions who did not play: Tommy Aaron, Jack Burke Jr., Billy Casper, Charles Coody, Nick Faldo, Raymond Floyd, Doug Ford, Bob Goalby, Jack Nicklaus, Arnold Palmer, Gary Player, Fuzzy Zoeller.  Nicklaus, Palmer, and Player served as "honorary starters" and teed off on the first day at the first hole to kick off the tournament.)

Tiger Woods (5,11,15,16,17,18) did not play due to back surgery.

2. Last five U.S. Open Champions
Lucas Glover, Graeme McDowell (15,17,18), Rory McIlroy (4,17,18), Justin Rose (12,15,16,17,18), Webb Simpson (15,16,17,18)

3. Last five British Open Champions
Stewart Cink, Darren Clarke, Ernie Els (12,17,18), Louis Oosthuizen (17,18)

4. Last five PGA Champions
Keegan Bradley (16,17,18), Jason Dufner (12,14,15,16,17,18), Martin Kaymer (17), Yang Yong-eun

5. Last three winners of The Players Championship
K. J. Choi, Matt Kuchar (11,15,16,17,18)

6. Top two finishers in the 2013 U.S. Amateur
Matt Fitzpatrick (a), Oliver Goss (a)

7. Winner of the 2013 British Amateur Championship
Garrick Porteous (a)

8. Winner of the 2013 Asia-Pacific Amateur Championship
Lee Chang-woo (a)

9. Winner of the 2013 U.S. Amateur Public Links
Jordan Niebrugge (a)

10. Winner of the 2013 U.S. Mid-Amateur
Mike McCoy (a)

11. The top 12 finishers and ties in the 2013 Masters Tournament
Tim Clark, Jason Day (12,15,16,17,18), Sergio García (16,17,18), John Huh, Marc Leishman, Thorbjørn Olesen, Brandt Snedeker (15,16,17,18), Lee Westwood (13,17,18)

12. Top 4 finishers and ties in the 2013 U.S. Open
Billy Horschel (15,16,17,18), Hunter Mahan (16,17,18)

13. Top 4 finishers and ties in the 2013 British Open Championship
Ian Poulter (17,18), Henrik Stenson (14,15,16,17,18)

14. Top 4 finishers and ties in the 2013 PGA Championship
Jonas Blixt (15,17), Jim Furyk (16,17,18)

15. Winners of PGA Tour events that award a full-point allocation for the season-ending Tour Championship, between the 2013 Masters Tournament and the 2014 Masters Tournament
Bae Sang-moon, Steven Bowditch, Ken Duke, Harris English (18), Derek Ernst, Matt Every (18), Bill Haas (16,17,18), Russell Henley (18), Dustin Johnson (16,17,18), Matt Jones, Chris Kirk, Ryan Moore (17,18), Patrick Reed (18), John Senden, Jordan Spieth (16,17,18), Kevin Stadler, Scott Stallings, Jimmy Walker (17,18), Boo Weekley (16)

16. All players qualifying for the 2013 edition of The Tour Championship
Roberto Castro, Brendon de Jonge, Graham DeLaet (17,18), Luke Donald (17,18), D. A. Points, Kevin Streelman (17,18), Steve Stricker (17,18), Nick Watney (17,18), Gary Woodland (18)

17. Top 50 on the final 2013 Official World Golf Ranking list
Thomas Bjørn (18), Jamie Donaldson (18), Victor Dubuisson (18), Gonzalo Fernández-Castaño (18), Rickie Fowler (18), Branden Grace, Peter Hanson, Thongchai Jaidee (18), Miguel Ángel Jiménez (18), Joost Luiten (18), David Lynn, Matteo Manassero, Hideki Matsuyama (18), Francesco Molinari (18)

18. Top 50 on the Official World Golf Ranking list on March 31, 2014
Stephen Gallacher

19. International invitees
None

Five players were appearing in their first major: Patrick Reed, Oliver Goss, Lee Chang-woo, Jordan Niebrugge and Mike McCoy.  A further 19 were appearing in their first Masters: Jonas Blixt, Steven Bowditch, Roberto Castro, Brendon de Jonge, Graham DeLaet, Victor Dubuisson, Harris English, Derek Ernst, Matt Every, Matt Fitzpatrick, Stephen Gallacher, Billy Horschel,  Matt Jones, Chris Kirk, Joost Luiten, Garrick Porteous, Jordan Spieth, Kevin Stadler and Jimmy Walker.  The total of 24 Masters debutants was a record, beating the 23 in 1935.

Craig Stadler and Kevin Stadler were the 12th father and son to play in the Masters, but the first to play in the same year.

Tiger Woods had played in 19 consecutive Masters (1995–2013).  Also absent was Pádraig Harrington who had appeared in the previous 14 Masters, and in every major in the last eight years.

Round summaries

First round
Thursday, April 10, 2014

Bill Haas led by a stroke after a 68 on the first day, one shot ahead of Louis Oosthuizen, Bubba Watson, and defending champion Adam Scott. There were 18 players, including Rory McIlroy, Jordan Spieth, Fred Couples and Rickie Fowler, within three shots of the lead after the first round. The weather conditions were near-perfect: clear and calm with temperatures in the mid-70s (24 °C).

Second round
Friday, April 11, 2014

2012 champion Bubba Watson recorded five consecutive birdies on holes 12–16 on his way to a round of 68 (−4) and a three-shot lead after 36 holes. Watson was the only player from the top-10 after the first round to match or better his score in the second round.  Joining Watson for the low round of the day (68) were Thomas Bjørn, Jim Furyk and John Senden. Three-time champion Phil Mickelson shot 73 (+1) and missed the cut at the Masters for the first time since 1997.

Amateurs: Goss (+3), Fitzpatrick (+5), Lee (+9), Niebrugge (+11), Porteous (+12), McCoy (+17).

Third round
Saturday, April 12, 2014

Second round leader Bubba Watson fell back to the field with a two-over-par 74. Jordan Spieth shot another round of 70 to tie Watson for first place at five-under-par. Miguel Ángel Jiménez shot the lowest round of the day, 66 (−6), to move into a tie for fifth place.

Final round
Sunday, April 13, 2014

Summary
Bubba Watson shot a 69 in the final round to win the Masters for the second time in three years. Jordan Spieth had taken the lead after a birdie on the second hole, and expanded his lead to 2 shots following a Watson bogey on the third. Spieth held the outright lead until the eighth hole, when Watson scored a birdie to Spieth's bogey. Another Watson birdie and Spieth bogey on the ninth hole gave Watson a two-shot lead, which he never relinquished and won going away, finishing three shots ahead of both Spieth and Swedish golfer Jonas Blixt. Blixt was the only player in the field to post four sub-par rounds. Joost Luiten shot the low round of the day, 67 (−5).

Final leaderboard

Scorecard

References

External links

Coverage on the PGA Tour's official site
Coverage from the PGA of America

2014
2014 in golf
2014 in American sports
2014 in sports in Georgia (U.S. state)
April 2014 sports events in the United States